Wanigam Bala is a village in Baramulla district in the union territory of Jammu and Kashmir, India.

Demographics 
According to the 2011 Census of India around 1,538 people live in the village with 780 people male and 758 people female.  The literacy rate in the village is 52.86% where around 57.56% of the male are literate and 48.02% of the females are literate.  There are around 212 houses in the village.

References

Villages in Baramulla district